The Little River, a watercourse that is part of the Hawkesbury-Nepean catchment, is located in the Southern Highlands region of New South Wales, Australia.

Course and features
The Little River rises south southeast of the locality of Wills Hill, near Robertson, and flows generally north before reaching its confluence with the Dudewaugh Creek, a tributary of the Burke River within the Upper Nepean River catchment.

See also 

 List of rivers of New South Wales (L–Z)
 List of rivers of Australia
 Rivers of New South Wales

References

External links
 

Rivers of New South Wales
Southern Highlands (New South Wales)
Wingecarribee Shire